Noviherbaspirillum malthae is a Gram-negative, aerobic and rod-shaped bacterium from the genus of Noviherbaspirillum which has beenn isolated from Kaohsiung County in Taiwan.

References

External links
Type strain of Noviherbaspirillum malthae at BacDive -  the Bacterial Diversity Metadatabase

Burkholderiales
Bacteria described in 2013